Carposina trigononotata is a moth of the family Carposinidae. It was first described by Lord Walsingham in 1907. It is endemic to the Hawaiian islands of Molokai and Maui.

The larvae feed on the terminal buds of Metrosideros species. The larvae bore in the stem of their host plant.

References

Carposinidae
Endemic moths of Hawaii
Biota of Molokai
Biota of Maui